This is a list of diplomatic missions in Nicaragua.  The capital, Managua, hosts 31 embassies. Several other countries have ambassadors accredited from other regional capitals.  Its role as a promoter of Third World causes during the Cold War led to the development of close ties with many non-aligned and socialist-leaning countries around the globe; other countries have ambassadors accredited from developing countries.

This listing excludes honorary consulates.

Embassies in Managua

Missions/Offices
 (Embassy office)
 (Delegation)
 (Swiss Cooperation Office)

Non-Resident Embassies
Resident in Mexico City unless otherwise noted

 (New York City)

 (Havana)
 

 (New York City)
  (Ottawa)
 (Washington, DC)
 (Washington, DC)
 (Panama City)
 (Guatemala City)

 (Havana)
 (Havana)
 (San Jose)
 (Washington, DC)
 (Washington, DC)
 
 (Havana)
 (Havana)
 (New York City)

 (San Jose)
 (Havana)
 
 (New York City)
 (Panama City)
 (Washington, DC)
 (New York City)

 (New York City) 
 (Washington, DC)
 (Havana)

 (Havana)
 (Havana)
 (New York City)
 (Panama City)
 (Havana)
 (Ottawa)
 (Panama City)
 (Panama City)

 (San Jose)

  
 (New York City)
 
 (Havana)
 (New York City)
 (Havana)
 (Havana)
  
 (New York City)
 (Ottawa)
 (Ottawa)
 (New York City)
 (New York City)
 (Havana)
 (Panama City)
 (Havana)
 (New York City)
 (New York City) 
 (San José)

 (Havana)

 (New York City)

 (Panama City)

 (Panama City)
 (San Jose)

 (Washington, DC)
 (Washington, DC)
 (Washington, DC)

 (Washington, DC)
 (New York City)
 (Guatemala City)
 (San Jose)
 (New York City)
 (New York City)
 (Caracas)
 (New York City)
 (New York City)

 (Washington, DC)
 (Washington, DC)
 (Washington, DC)
 (San Jose)
 (Washington, DC)
 (New York City) 
 (New York City)
 (New York City)
 (New York City)
 (New York City)
 (Bogota)
 (San Jose)

 (New York City)

 (Havana)
 (Havana)
 (Havana)

Closed missions

See also
Foreign relations of Nicaragua

References

Resident missions in Nicaragua

Foreign relations of Nicaragua
Diplomatic missions
Nicaragua
Diplomatic missions in Nicaragua
Diplomatic missions